William Oliver Wallace (8 December 1929 – 8 March 2009), known by his stage name Ali Bongo, was an English comedy magician and former president of The Magic Circle who performed an act in which he was known as the "Shriek of Araby".

Early life
Born as William Oliver Wallace in Bangalore, British India, where his father (also called William) was serving as a sergeant major with the 1st Battalion of the Queen's Own Royal West Kent Regiment. Young William spent his early years on a British station in Trimulgherry, Secunderabad before going to Britain with his mother Lillian, at the age of seven.

After William Wallace senior had ended his army service, the family moved to Sutton Valence in Kent and young William won a scholarship to Sutton Valence School, leaving at 16 to begin his career as an entertainer. His time in National Service was spent with the Royal Army Pay Corps. He worked for Harry Stanley's Unique Magic Studio and was manager of the magic department at Hamleys toy shop in London's Regent Street.

Career
Wallace created his Shriek of Araby character with an oriental costume (robes, golden curly-toed slippers, horn-rimmed spectacles and headgear that incorporated both fez and turban) and took the name Ali Bongo from a character he had created for a youth club pantomime he had co-written and appeared in while in his teens. The original character had sung a song which began: "My name is Ali Bongo and I come from Pongo, pong-tiddley-pongo land." Among his later magic catch-phrases were "Uju Buju Suck Another Juju", "Aldy Bority Phostico Formio", "Hocus Pocus Fishbones Chokus".

He made his British TV debut on The Good Old Days in 1965 on a bill topped by Tommy Trinder.

Ali Bongo wrote many books on magic, many containing tricks of his own. He also illustrated them in his instantly recognisable style.  He acted as magic consultant for many plays, opera, ballets and TV shows including David Nixon's Magic Box and The David Nixon Magic Show for Thames Television and The Paul Daniels Magic Show for the BBC.

Ali Bongo was the presenter of the Ali Bongo’s Cartoon Carnival, which featured himself and his assistant Oscar. It aired on UK TV BBC1 on Saturdays between 23 October and 18 December 1971, a total of nine episodes.

Bongo was featured in an episode of Children's TV show Rainbow, appeared in the science-fiction show The Tomorrow People in the serial "Revenge of Jedikiah" and had a slot in Zokko!. He also acted as the magical advisor on the TV show Doctor Who and the 70s cult series, Ace of Wands. In 1988 he made a brief appearance in the LWT newspaper-based comedy show Hot Metal. His well-known ability for devising tricks and illusions and solving magical problems inspired the TV writer, David Renwick, to create a character who was a magician's assistant and amateur sleuth in the series Jonathan Creek. Bongo was magical adviser to the series.

Bongo joined The Magic Circle in 1960 and, two years later was made a Member of The Inner Magic Circle. He won The Magic Circle Magician of the Year in 1972, the Carlton Comedy Award in 1983 and the David Berglas Award in 1991. He served twice as vice-president of The Magic Circle before being elected president on 8 September 2008.

Death
At the beginning of February 2009, Bongo collapsed while giving a lecture in Paris. He was taken to hospital and, whilst there, suffered a stroke. Bongo was subsequently returned to the United Kingdom and cared for in St Thomas's Hospital, London, where he later died from complications arising from pneumonia on 8 March.

Ali Bongo's cremation and broken wand ceremony took place on 27 March 2009 at Randalls Park Crematorium, Leatherhead.

See also
Paul Daniels

References

External links
The Magic Circle website Ali Bongo, President
Ali Bongo biography at Jonathan Creek on the BBC
Interview with Ali Bongo at Jonathan Creek on the BBC
Obituary in The Daily Telegraph
Obituary in The Economist
Obituary in The Guardian
Obituary in The Independent
Obituary in The Times

1929 births
2009 deaths
English male comedians
English magicians
Deaths from pneumonia in England
Artists from Bangalore
People educated at Sutton Valence School
20th-century British comedians
Royal Army Pay Corps soldiers
20th-century British Army personnel
People from Bangalore
People from Sutton Valence
Academy of Magical Arts Creative Fellowship winners
Academy of Magical Arts Lecturer of the Year winners
Academy of Magical Arts Masters Fellowship winners